Maryna Ivashchanka (born November 8, 1993) is a Belarusian basketball player for Energa Toruń and the Belarusian national team.

She participated at the EuroBasket Women 2017.

References

1993 births
Living people
Belarusian women's basketball players
People from Rechytsa
Power forwards (basketball)
Belarusian expatriate basketball people in Poland
Basketball players at the 2019 European Games
European Games medalists in basketball
European Games bronze medalists for Belarus
Sportspeople from Gomel Region